The 1992 Daikyo IndyCar Grand Prix was the opening round of the 1992 CART World Series season, held on 22 March 1992 on the Surfers Paradise Street Circuit, Queensland, Australia.

Qualifying results

Race

Notes 

 Time of race 2:20:33.00
 Average Speed 77.561 mph

External links
 Full Weekend Times & Results
 1992 Daikyo IndyCar Grand Prix

Daikyo IndyCar Grand Prix
Daikyo IndyCar Grand Prix
Gold Coast Indy 300